The baiji (Lipotes vexillifer, Lipotes meaning "left behind" and vexillifer "flag bearer") is a possibly extinct species of freshwater dolphin native to the Yangtze river system in China. It is thought to be the first dolphin species driven to extinction due to the impact of humans. This dolphin is listed as “critically endangered: possibly extinct” by the IUCN, has not been seen in 40 years, and several surveys of the Yangtze have failed to find it. In China, the species is also called the Chinese river dolphin, Han river dolphin, Yangtze dolphin and whitefin dolphin. Nicknamed the "Goddess of the Yangtze", it was regarded as the goddess of protection by local fishermen and boatmen. It is not to be confused with the Chinese white dolphin (Sousa chinensis) or the finless porpoise (Neophocaena phocaenoides).

The baiji population declined drastically in decades as China industrialized and made heavy use of the river for fishing, transportation, and hydroelectricity. It has been credibly claimed, after surveys in the Yangtze River during the 1980s, that baiji could be the first dolphin species in history that humans have driven to extinction. A Conservation Action Plan for Cetaceans of the Yangtze River was approved by the Chinese Government in 2001. Efforts were made to conserve the species, but a late 2006 expedition failed to find any baiji in the river. Organizers declared the baiji functionally extinct. The baiji represents the first documented global extinction of an aquatic "megafaunal" vertebrate in over 50 years since the demise of the Japanese sea lion (Zalophus japonicus) and the Caribbean monk seal (Neomonachus tropicalis) in the 1950s. It also signified the disappearance of an entire mammal family of river dolphins (Lipotidae).  The baiji's extinction would be the first recorded extinction of a well-studied cetacean species (it is unclear if some previously extinct varieties were species or subspecies) to be directly attributable to human influence. The baiji is one of a number of extinctions to have taken place due to the degradation of the Yangtze, alongside that of the Chinese paddlefish, as well as the now extinct in the wild Yangtze sturgeon.

Swiss economist and CEO of the baiji.org Foundation August Pfluger funded an expedition in which an international team, taken in part from the National Oceanic and Atmospheric Administration and the Fisheries Research Agency in Japan, searched for six weeks for signs of the dolphin. The search took place almost a decade after the last exploration in 1997, which turned up only 13 of the cetaceans.

In August 2007, a Chinese man reportedly videotaped a large white animal swimming in the Yangtze. Although the animal was tentatively identified as a baiji, the presence of only one or a few animals, particularly of advanced age, is not enough to save a functionally extinct species from true extinction. The last known living baiji was Qiqi (淇淇), who died in 2002. The World Wildlife Fund is calling for the preservation of any possible baiji habitat, in case the species is located and can be revived.

Anatomy and morphology
Baiji were thought to breed in the first half of the year, the peak calving season being from February to April. A 30% pregnancy rate was observed. Gestation would last 10–11 months, delivering one calf at a time; the interbirth interval was 2 years. Males reached sexual maturity at age four, females at age six. Mature males were about  (7.5 ft) long, females , the longest specimen . The Yangtze River Dolphin is pale blue to gray on the dorsal (back) side, and white on the ventral (belly) side. It has a long and slightly upturned beak with 31–36 conical teeth on either jaw. Its dorsal fin is low and triangular in shape and resembles a light-colored flag when the dolphin swims just below the surface of the murky Yangtze River, hence the name "white-flag" dolphin. It has smaller eyes compared to oceanic dolphins.

When escaping from danger, the baiji can reach , but usually stays within . Because of its poor vision, the baiji relies primarily on sonar for navigation. The sonar system also plays an important role in socializing, predator avoidance, group coordination, and expressing emotions. Sound emission is focused and highly directed by the shape of the skull and melon. Peak frequencies of echolocation clicks are between 70 kHz and 100 kHz.

Distribution
Historically the baiji occurred along  of the middle and lower reaches of the Yangtze from Yichang in the west to the mouth of the river, near to Shanghai, as well as in Poyang and Dongting lakes, and the smaller Qiantang river to the south. This had been reduced by several hundred kilometres both upstream and downstream, and was limited to the main channel of the Yangtze, principally the middle reaches between the two large tributary lakes, Dongting and Poyang. Approximately 12% of the world's human population lives and works within the Yangtze River catchment area, putting pressure on the river.

Evolutionary history

The Baiji is not closely related to any living species of dolphin, having diverged from the ancestors of the La Plata dolphin and Amazon River dolphin during the Miocene, estimated to be around 16 million years ago. The closest known relative of the Baiji is Parapontoporia, native to the Western Coast of North America during the Latest Miocene and Pliocene. The Baiji was one of five species of dolphins known to have made fresh water their exclusive habitat. The other five species, including the boto and the La Plata dolphin, have survived in the Río de la Plata and Amazon rivers in South America and the Ganges and Indus rivers on the Indian subcontinent.

It is well known the river dolphins are not a natural group. Their mitochondrial genome reveals a split of two separate lineages, Platanista and Lipotes + (Inia + Pontoporia), having no sister relationship with each other, and the Platanista lineage is always within the odontocete clade instead of having a closer affinity to Mysticeti. The position of the Platanista is more basal, suggesting separate divergence of this lineage well before the other one. The Lipotes has a sister relationship with Inia + pontoporia, and they together formed the sister group to the Delphinoidea. This result strongly supports paraphyly of the classical river dolphins, and the nonplatanistoid river dolphins do represent a monophyletic grouping, with the Lipotidae as the sister taxa to (Iniidae + Pontoporiidae), and is well congruent with the studies based on short interspersed repetitive elements (SINEs).

Low values of haplotype diversity and nucleotide diversity were found for the baiji of the Yangtze River. The analysis of molecular variance (AMOVA) supported a high level of overall genetic structure. The males having a higher genetic differentiation than the females suggested a significant female-biased dispersal.

The aquatic adaptations of the baiji and other cetaceans have happened slowly and can be linked to positively selected genes (PSGs) and/or other functional changes. Comparative genopic analyses have uncovered that the baiji have a slow molecular clock and molecular adaptations to their aquatic environment. This information leads scientists to conclude that a bottleneck must have occurred near the end of the last deglaciation, a time that coincided with rapid temperature decrease and a rise in eustatic sea level. Scientists have also looked into PSGs in the baiji genome which are used for DNA repair and response to DNA stimulus. These PSGs have not been found in any other mammal species. Pathways being used for DNA repair have been known to have a major impact on brain development and have been implicated in diseases including microcephaly. The slow down of the substitution rate among cetaceans may have been affected by the evolution of DNA damage pathways. Over time, river dolphins, including the baiji, have had a reduction in the size of their eyes and the acuity of their vision. This probably stems from poor visibility in fluvial and estuarine environments. When analyzing the baiji genome, scientists have found that there are four genes that have lost their function due to a frameshift mutation or premature stop codons. The baiji has the lowest single nucleotide polymorphism (SNP) frequency reported thus far among mammals. This low frequency could be related to the relatively low rate of molecular evolution in cetaceans; however, considering that the decrease in the rate of molecular evolution in the baiji was not as great as the decrease in heterozygosity rate, it is likely that much of the low genetic diversity observed was caused by the precipitous decline in the total baiji population in recent decades and the associated breedings.

The reconstructed demographic history over the last 100,000 years featured a continual population contraction through the last glacial maximum, a serious bottleneck during the last deglaciation, and sustained population growth after the eustatic sea level approached the current levels. The close correlation between population trends, regional temperatures, and eustatic sea levels suggest a dominant role for global and local climate changes in shaping the baiji's ancient population demography.

Folklore 
Per Chinese folklore, a beautiful young girl is said to have lived with her stepfather on the banks of the river Yangtze. He was evil, and a greedy man out for his own self-interest. One day, he took the girl on a boat, intending to sell her on the market. Out on the river, though, he became infatuated with her beauty and tried to take advantage of her. But she freed herself by plunging into the river whereupon a big storm came and sank the boat. After the storm had thus settled, people saw a beautiful dolphin swimming – the incarnation of the girl – which became known as the "Goddess of the Yangtze". The baiji, in the region of Yangtze, is regarded as a symbol of peace and prosperity.

Conservation
In the 1950s, the population was estimated at 6,000 animals, but declined rapidly over the subsequent five decades. Only a few hundred were left by 1970. Then the number fell to 400 by the 1980s and then to 13 in 1997 when a full-fledged search was conducted. The baiji was last sighted in August 2004, though there was a possible sighting in 2007. It is listed as an endangered species by the U.S. government under the Endangered Species Act. It is now thought to be extinct.

Causes of decline

The World Conservation Union (IUCN) has noted the following as threats to the species: a period of hunting by humans during the Great Leap Forward, entanglement in fishing gear, the illegal practice of electric fishing, collisions with boats and ships, habitat loss, and pollution. Further studies have noted that a lack of information on the baiji's historical distribution or ecology, the environmental impact of the construction of the Three Gorges Dam on the living space of the baiji, and the failure to act for the protection of the baiji are also threats to the species.

During the Great Leap Forward, when traditional veneration of the baiji was denounced, it was hunted for its flesh and skin, and quickly became scarce.

As China developed economically, pressure on the river dolphin grew significantly. Industrial and residential waste flowed into the Yangtze. The riverbed was dredged and reinforced with concrete in many locations. Ship traffic multiplied, boats grew in size, and fishermen employed wider and more lethal nets. Noise pollution caused the nearly blind animal to collide with propellers. Stocks of the dolphin's prey declined drastically in the late 20th century, with some fish populations declining to one thousandth of their pre-industrial levels.

A range of anthropogenic led causes (e.g. boat collisions, dam construction) which also threaten freshwater cetaceans in other river systems, have been implicated in the decline of the baiji population. However, the primary factor was probably unsustainable by-catch in local fisheries, which use rolling hooks, nets (gill nets and fyke nets) and electrofishing; similarly by-catch constitutes the principal cause of mortality in many populations of small cetaceans worldwide. Although there are relatively few data available on baiji mortality, at least half of all known baiji deaths in the 1970s and 1980s were caused by rolling hooks and other fishing gear, and electrofishing accounted for 40% of baiji deaths recorded during the 1990s. Unlike most historical-era extinctions of large-bodied animals, the baiji was
the victim not of active persecution but of incidental mortality resulting from massive-scale human environmental impacts, primarily uncontrolled fishing.

Its extinction merely reflects the latest stage in the progressive ecological deterioration of the Yangtze region. In the 1970s and 1980s, an estimated half of baiji deaths were attributed to entanglement in fishing gear and nets. By the early 2000s, electric fishing was considered "the most important and immediate direct threat to the baiji's survival". Though outlawed, this fishing technique is widely and illegally practiced throughout China. The building of the Three Gorges Dam further reduced the dolphin's habitat and facilitated an increase in ship traffic; these were thought to make it extinct in the wild.

There are some scientists who have found that pollution has resulted in emerging diseases caused by parasitic infection in the Baiji population. The Baiji's reliance on aquatic environments could have resulted in interaction with both terrestrial and marine pathogen risks. Since the Baiji has a limited distribution endemic to the Yangtze River, the freshwater environment may have a higher pathogen level than marine waters (although systematic environmental studies have yet to be conducted). The pathogens in these waters could lead to viral infections that can result in epizootics, which has caused the deaths of thousands of marine mammals over the last twenty years. There have also been captured/killed individuals that have had helminth infestations in the stomach which leads scientists to believe that parasitic infections could be another cause of decline amongst the Baiji.

It has been noted, however, that the declining geographical range that baiji have been spotted in is not connected to the population loss of baiji. A model provided by Yangtze fishing communities show that the baiji population was not connected by geographical range or fragmentation of location, as the baiji make long-term and periodic movements throughout several years. The movements of the baiji left the species unaffected by dwindling geographical range.

Surveys

Conservation efforts

During the 1970s, China recognized the precarious state of the river dolphin. The government outlawed deliberate killing, restricted fishing, and established nature reserves.

In 1978, the Chinese Academy of Sciences established the Freshwater Dolphin Research Centre (淡水海豚研究中心) as a branch of the Wuhan Institute of Hydrobiology. In the 1980s and 1990s, several attempts were made to capture dolphins and relocate them to a reserve. A breeding program would then allow the species to recover and be reintroduced to the Yangtze after conditions improve. However, capturing the rare, quick dolphins proved to be difficult, and few captives survived more than a few months.

The first Chinese aquatic species protection organisation, the Baiji Dolphin Conservation Foundation of Wuhan (武汉白鱀豚保护基金), was founded in December 1996. It has raised 1,383,924.35 CNY (about 100,000) and used the funds for in vitro cell preservation and to maintain the baiji facilities, including the Shishou Sanctuary that was flooded in 1998.

Since 1992, five protected areas of the Yangtze have been designated as baiji reserves. Four were built in the main Yangtze channel where baiji are actively protected and fishing is banned: two national reserves (Shishou City and Xin-Luo) and two provincial (Tongling and Zhenjiang). In the past 20 years, five nature reserves have been
established along the river. Imposing maximum prohibition of harmful and
illegal fishing methods in the reserves might prolong the process of extinction
of these cetaceans in the wild, but so far, the administrative measures taken
in the reserves have not yet kept the baiji population from sharply declining. As humans continue to occupy the river and use the natural resources it provided, the question as to whether the river itself can reach a point later in the future to become a habitat for these species to live in once again remained, for the most part, unanswered by conservationists. In Shishou, Hubei Province, and Tongling, Anhui Province, the two semi-natural reserves established in these regions aimed to build in an environment for the baiji, as well as another mammalian species, the finless porpoise, to breed. Through careful management, both these species not only survived, but did in fact reproduce successfully enough to
provide some hope that the Baiji may be able to make a comeback.

The fifth protected area is an isolated oxbow lake located off of the north bank of the river near to Shishou City: the Tian-e-Zhou Oxbow Semi-natural Reserve.

As well as these five protected areas there are also five "Protection Stations" in Jianli, Chenglingji, Hukou, Wuhu and Zhengjiang. These stations consist of two observers and a motorized fishing boat with the aim of conducting daily patrols, making observations and investigating reports of illegal fishing.

In 2001, the Chinese government approved a Conservation Action Plan for Cetaceans of the Yangtze River. This plan re-emphasised the three measures identified at the 1986 workshop and was adopted as the national policy for the conservation of the Baiji. Despite all of these workshops and conventions little money was available in China to aid the conservation efforts. It has been estimated that US$1 million was needed to begin the project and maintain it for a further 3 years.

Efforts to save the mammals proved to be too little and too late. August Pfluger, chief executive of the Baiji.org Foundation, said, "The strategy of the Chinese government was a good one, but we didn't have time to put it into action." Furthermore, the conservation attempts have been criticized, as even with the international attention about the need for conservation for the baiji, the Chinese government did not "[make] any serious investment" to protect the baiji.

In situ and ex situ conservation
Most scientists agreed that the best course of action was an ex situ effort working in parallel with an in situ effort. The deterioration of the Yangtze River had to be reversed to preserve the habitat. The ex-situ projects aimed to raise a large enough population over time so that some, if not all, of the dolphins could be returned to the Yangtze, so the habitat within the river had to be maintained anyway.

Shishou has been described as being "like a miniature Yangtze ... possessing all of the requirements for a semi-natural reserve". From the designation as a national reserve in 1992 it has been intended to be used for not only the baiji but also the Yangtze finless porpoise. In 1990 the first finless porpoises were relocated to the reserve and since then have been surviving and reproducing well. As of April 2005 26 finless porpoises were known to live in the reserve. A baiji was introduced in December 1995, but died during the summer flood of 1996. To deal with these annual floods a dyke was constructed between the Yangtze and Shishou. Now water is controlled from a sluice gate located at the downstream mouth of the oxbow lake. It has been reported that since the installation of this sluice gate, water quality has declined since no annual transfer of nutrients can occur. Roughly 6,700 people live on the island within the oxbow lake and so some limited fishing is permitted.

The success of Shishou with the porpoises and with migratory birds and other wetland fauna encouraged the local Wetlands Management Team to put forward an application to award the site Ramsar status. It has also been noted that the site has incredible potential for ecotourism, which could be used to generate much needed revenue to improve the quality of the reserve. The necessary infrastructure does not currently exist to realize these opportunities.

Captive specimens

A baiji conservation dolphinarium was established at the Institute of Hydrobiology (IHB) in Wuhan in 1980, and rebuilt in 1992. This was planned as a backup to any other conservation efforts by producing an area completely protected from any threats, and where the baiji could be easily observed. The site includes an indoor and outdoor holding pool, a water filtration system, food storage and preparation facilities, research labs and a small museum. The aim is to also generate income from tourism which can be put towards the baiji plight.

Douglas Adams and Mark Carwardine documented their encounters with the endangered animals on their conservation travels for the BBC programme Last Chance to See. Through firsthand experience, they went to China, drinking Baiji beer and Baiji cola, staying in the Baiji Hotel and using Lipotes vexillifer toilet paper. They came across Baiji weighing scales and Baiji fertilizer. They met Qi Qi, the beautiful bluish-grey dolphin with a long, narrow, slightly upturned beak, a low triangular dorsal fin, broad flippers with tiny eyes. Qi-Qi was just a year old then, injured by fishing hooks in 1980 and taken into captivity to be nursed back to health. Out of the seven times Mark and Douglas had visited China, never did they encounter a wild and free Yangtze river dolphin. It is even more impossible now with the likelihood that Lipotes vexillfer may be the first cetacean to have been driven to extinction by human activity. The book by the same name, published in 1990, included pictures of a captive specimen, a male named Qi Qi (淇淇) that lived in the Wuhan Institute of Hydrobiology dolphinarium from 1980 to July 14, 2002. Discovered by a fisherman in Dongting Lake, he became the sole resident of the Baiji Dolphinarium (白鱀豚水族馆) beside East Lake. A sexually mature female was captured in late 1995, but died after half a year in 1996 when the Tian-e-Zhou Oxbow Nature Reserve (石首半自然白鱀豚保护区), which had contained only finless porpoises since 1990, was flooded.

Current status

The Xinhua News Agency announced on December 4, 2006, that no Chinese river dolphins were detected in a six-week survey of the Yangtze River conducted by 30 researchers. The failure of the Yangtze Freshwater Dolphin Expedition raised suspicions of the first unequivocal extinction of a cetacean species due to human action (some extinct baleen whale populations might not have been distinct species). Poor water and weather conditions may have prevented sightings, but expedition leaders declared it "functionally extinct" on December 13, 2006, as fewer are likely to be alive than are needed to propagate the species. However, footage believed to be a baiji from August 2007 was released to the public.

The Japanese sea lion and Caribbean monk seal disappeared in the 1950s, the most recent aquatic mammals to become extinct. Several land-based mammal species and subspecies have disappeared since then. If the baiji is extinct, the vaquita (Phocoena sinus) has become the most endangered marine mammal species.

Some scientists retain hope for the species:

A report of the expedition was published online in the journal Biology Letters on August 7, 2007, in which the authors conclude "We are forced to conclude that the baiji is now likely to be extinct, probably due to unsustainable by-catch in local fisheries".

"Witness to Extinction: How We Failed To Save The Yangtze River Dolphin", an account of the 2006 baiji survey by Samuel Turvey, the lead author of the Biology Letters paper, was published by Oxford University Press in autumn 2008. This book investigated the baiji's probable extinction within the wider-scale context of how and why international efforts to conserve the species had failed, and whether conservation recovery programmes for other threatened species were likely to face similar potentially disastrous administrative hurdles.

Some reports suggest that information about the baiji and its demise is being suppressed in China. Other reports cite government media English language reports in China Central Television and Xinhua News Agency as evidence to the contrary.

Sightings
In August 2007, Zeng Yujiang reportedly videotaped a large white animal swimming in the Yangtze in Anhui Province. Wang Kexiong of the Institute of Hydrobiology of the Chinese Academy of Sciences has tentatively confirmed that the animal on the video is a baiji.

On October 11, 2007, Chinese state media announced that under a development plan an additional 4,000,000 people will be relocated from their homes near the dam by 2020 due to ecological concerns, while a forum of officials and experts warned of a possible "environmental catastrophe" if preventive measures are not taken. Currently, the quality of water in the Yangtze is falling rapidly, due to the dam's preventing dispersal of pollutants; algae blooms have risen progressively since the dam's construction; and soil erosion has increased, causing riverbank collapses and landslides. The report detailing this was officially released in September 2007. Senior Chinese government officials and scholars said the dam could cause a "huge disaster ... if steps are not taken promptly." The same scholars and officials previously had defended the Three Gorges Dam project. Xinhua also reported that tens of billions of yuan had been spent to prevent pollution and geological disasters by tree planting, measures to maintain species diversification, shutting down 1,500 polluting industrial and mining enterprises and building 70 sewage and waste treatment plants, all of which are "progressing well."

In October 2016 several news sources announced a recent sighting of what has been speculated to be a baiji. However, the purported re-discovery was disputed by the conservation biologist Samuel Turvey, who was a member of the 2006 survey team. Turvey instead proposed to shift conservation focus to the critically endangered Yangtze finless porpoise, the only freshwater cetaceans left in China.

There was a sighting claimed to belong to Baiji surfacing along with a pod of finless porpoises at Tongling in Anhui province in April 2018.

See also

Environmental issues in China
Ganges shark
Holocene extinction
List of cetaceans
List of endangered and protected species of China
Wildlife of China

References

External links

 US National Marine Fisheries Service baiji web page
 The Baiji Foundation – Networking Expertise for Conservation of Freshwater Biodiversity
 
 U.S. Fish & Wildlife Service Species Profile 

2007 in the environment
Mammals described in 1918
EDGE species
Endemic fauna of China
Mammals of China
River dolphins
Extant Miocene first appearances
Yangtze River
Species endangered by pollution
Species endangered by use as food
Species endangered by damming
Species endangered by collisions with vehicles
Species endangered by being bycatch
Endangered fauna of Asia
Taxa named by Gerrit Smith Miller Jr.
Critically endangered fauna of China